Wide angle may refer to:

 Wide-angle lens, type of camera lens
 Wide Angle (TV series), television series
 Wide Angle, 1999 album by Hybrid
 Wide Angles, 2003 album by Michael Brecker
 Wide-angle X-ray scattering
 Wide Angle Youth Media